Alfred Gusenbauer (born 8 February 1960) is an Austrian politician who until 2008 spent his entire professional life as an employee of the Social Democratic Party of Austria (SPÖ) or as a parliamentary representative. He headed the SPÖ from 2000 to 2008, and served as Chancellor of Austria from January 2007 to December 2008. Since then he has pursued a career as a consultant and lecturer, and as a member of supervisory boards of Austrian companies.

Early life and education
Gusenbauer was born in Sankt Pölten in the state of Lower Austria on 8 February 1960. He was educated at a high school in Wieselburg and studied political science, philosophy and jurisprudence at the University of Vienna, where he obtained a doctorate in political science in 1987. Gusenbauer was federal leader of the SPÖ youth wing, the Socialist Youth (SJ) from 1984 to 1990; vice-president of the International Union of Socialist Youth from 1985 to 1989 and vice-president of the Socialist International in 1989. He was then made a senior research fellow in the economic policy department of the Lower Austria section of the Chamber of Labour from 1990 to 1999.

Chairman of the Social Democratic Party
In 1991, Gusenbauer was elected SPÖ chairman in Ybbs an der Donau and a member of the Lower Austria party executive following the resignation of SPÖ chairman Viktor Klima. In the same year he was elected to the Bundesrat (the upper house of the Austrian Parliament) as a deputy for Lower Austria. He was a member of the Austrian delegation to the parliamentary meeting of the Council of Europe in 1991 and was chairman of the social committee of the Council of Europe from 1995 to 1998.

In the Bundesrat, Gusenbauer was chairman of the Committee for Development Co-operation  from 1996 to 1999. In 2000, he was elected leader of the SPÖ Group in the Bundesrat and also as secretary-general of the SPÖ. Under his leadership in the 2002 elections the SPÖ improved its vote and gained four seats, but failed to defeat the Austrian People's Party (ÖVP) government of Chancellor Wolfgang Schüssel. Gusenbauer had campaigned on a platform of more social spending and certain tax cuts.

During 2006, the SPÖ was handicapped by its involvement in the "BAWAG scandal" in which directors of the BAWAG, an Austrian bank owned by the Austrian Trade Union Federation (Österreichischer Gewerkschaftsbund, ÖGB), were accused of corruption, embezzlement and illicit speculation. The scandal led in March to the resignation of ÖGB head Fritz Verzetnitsch. The SPÖ as a party was not involved in the fraud but Gusenbauer found it politically expedient to exclude ÖGB leaders from the lists of SPÖ candidates, drawing criticism from the ÖGB.

Chancellor of Austria
After the 2006 elections, the SPÖ was the largest single party but had no absolute majority of the parliamentary seats. A grand coalition between the ÖVP and the SPÖ was considered the most likely outcome. After prolonged negotiations, Gusenbauer became chancellor on 11 January 2007 at the head of an SPÖ-ÖVP coalition.

In July 2007, Gusenbauer led the Austrian delegation to the 119th session of the International Olympic Committee in Guatemala City to present the proposal for Salzburg as host of the 2014 Winter Olympics; the proposal eventually lost against Sochi, whose bid was presented by President Vladimir V. Putin of Russia.

Gusenbauer immediately drew criticism because he abandoned central promises of the SPÖ election campaign, such as those to abolish university tuition fees (it was decided by the SPÖ instead that students should do community service for 60 hours, which resulted in student protests) and to reverse the country's Eurofighter deal. This provoked public criticism even from SPÖ members. Infighting over Gusenbauer's ability to lead his party never subsided from this point onwards. On 16 June 2008, Gusenbauer was replaced as SPÖ chief by his minister of transport Werner Faymann. However, he formally remained chancellor until after the 2008 snap elections that were called in early July 2008 when the Austrian People's Party (ÖVP), led by Wilhelm Molterer, left the governing coalition. His time in office was the shortest since World War II.

Post-politics career
Gusenbauer briefly returned to his old post in the Chamber of Labour but immediately took on paid and unpaid positions in the private and non-profit sectors.

In 2009, Faymann prevented Gusenbauer's candidacy for the office of High Representative of the Union for Foreign Affairs and Security Policy by agreeing to the nomination of Johannes Hahn from his centre-right junior coalition partner ÖVP as Austria's Member of the European Commission.

Corporate boards
Gusenbauer was made a member of the supervisory board of Alpine Holding, an Austrian construction conglomerate, in July 2009 and resigned from this position effective 1 May 2010, when it was announced that Gusenbauer was to head the supervisory board of Strabag (Austria's leading construction company) on 18 June 2010. At the same time he was to become chairman of the board of trustees of the private foundation established by Strabag's chairman, Hans Peter Haselsteiner.

In an article about Western leaders working for authoritarian regimes, Associated Press reported that Gusenbauer works as a consultant to Kazakh president Nursultan Nazarbayev. In September 2013, he became an advisor to Serbian deputy prime minister and leader of the Serbian Progressive Party Aleksandar Vucic. In 2018, reports surfaced claiming that Gusenbauer had met with members of Congress in Washington as part of a 2013 lobbying campaign orchestrated by Paul Manafort on behalf of Ukrainian president Viktor Yanukovych.

Other positions include: 
 Citigroup, member of the European Advisory Board
 CUDOS Capital AG, chairman of the supervisory board
 Equitas Capital, member of the board and chairman of European Funds (since 2009)
 Gabriel Resources, member of the board of directors (Member of the Corporate Governance and Compensation Committee)
 Haselsteiner Familien-Privatstiftung, chairman
 RHI AG, member of the supervisory board (since 2013)
 Wartenfels Privatstiftung, chairman of the board

Non-profit organizations
From 2009 to 2011, Gusenbauer was the first Leitner Global Fellow at the Columbia University School of International and Public Affairs in New York.

Other positions include: 
 Austrian Society for China Studies (ÖGCF), president of the board of trustees
 Austrian-Spanish Chamber of Commerce, president
 Bonner Akademie für Forschung und Lehre praktischer Politik (BAPP), member of the board of trustees
 Club de Madrid, Member
 Dr. Karl Renner Institute, president
 Verein für Geschichte der ArbeiterInnenbewegung, member of the board of trustees

Controversy
In 1984, Gusenbauer, then leader of Austria's Young Socialists, caused controversy in Austria when he knelt and kissed the still-Communist tarmac at Moscow's Domodedovo airport – in mockery of Pope John Paul II.

Paradise Papers 
In November 2017 an investigation conducted by the International Consortium of Investigative Journalism cited his name in the list of politicians named in the "Paradise Papers" allegations.

Manafort indictment 
The 2018 February 16 indictment of Paul Manafort unsealed on 23 February as part of the Mueller special counsel investigation alleges that foreign politicians hypothesized to be Romano Prodi and Gusenbauer took payments exceeding $2m from Manafort to promote the case of his client, then-president of Ukraine Viktor Yanukovich.

See also 
 Gusenbauer cabinet

References

External links 

|-

1960 births
Living people
21st-century Chancellors of Austria
University of Vienna alumni
Columbia University fellows
Chancellors of Austria
Social Democratic Party of Austria politicians
People from Sankt Pölten
People named in the Paradise Papers